Maradhoo-Feydhoo (Dhivehi: މަރަދޫފޭދޫ) is a district of Addu City, in the Maldives.  The district borders the district of Maradhoo to the north, as they both share the same natural island, and the district of Feydhoo to the south. After Addu City became a city, Maradhoo-Feydhoo was extended to include the previous administrative island and a part of Feydhoo.
The district has a village known as Feydhooburi (translates to 'North Feydhoo'). People still often refer to this village by the district's name.

History

Prior to relocation in the 1970s, the area that is currently administered as Maradhoo-Feydhoo was forestlands on Maradhoo island.

Originally inhabitants of Feydhoo, the families of present-day Maradhoo-Feydhoo natives have inhabited Addu for centuries. Local tales and writing, as well as more formal recorded history, are indicative of intermarriages between families of Meedhoo island and those of Feydhoo (which was then occupied by the ancestors of present-day Maradhoo-Feydhoo). A Feydhoo island chief during the mid 1800s, Katheeb Kaleyge (an honourific moniker that refers to his position) married Karankaleyge Mariyam, who is a descendant of Sultan Ali VII of the short-lived Isdhoo dynasty.

A 'Feydhoo Ganduvaru' (literally 'Feydhoo Palace') is also said to have existed, occupied by the family of one of Prince Abdulla's wives. Due to the prince's numerous marriages in the southern atolls (Huvadhoo, Fuvahmulah, and Addu), it is likely that this claim may have some merit.

Traditionally, all islands in the Maldives have been ruled by an island chief, or Katheeb (comes from the Arabic word 'Katib'), with authority vested by the Sultan to allocate land, adjudicate in disputes, lead prayer congregations and administer basic education. While not officially a hereditary position, in Feydhoo and later Maradhoo-Feydhoo, the position had been held by the same family for over two hundred years before the position was abolished countrywide by the Decentralisation Act in 2010, establishing democratically elected local councils for cities and rural areas.

Relocation for British Airforce Base

The inhabitants of Feydhoo island were transferred to neighbouring Maradhoo island under orders from the central government in Malé during the early 1970s so that the natives of Gan island could inhabit Feydhoo. This was part of then Prime Minister Ahmed Zaki's negotiations with British colonial powers, who had established a military base in the atoll.

The move was immensely unpopular with island inhabitants, and Feydhoo's chief magistrate at the time Ibrahin Kalo (a descendant of Katheeb Kaleyge, who would later adopt the more modern name 'Ibrahim Anees', and become island chief of Maradhoo-Feydhoo) was detained by soldiers from the capital city. According to oral sources, Feydhoo residents were forcibly placed on boats and transferred to Maradhoo.

Those people were placed in the houses of Maradhoo inhabitants, and given handsome food rations by the Royal Air Force, before half the island was given to them. This area was later named Maradhoo-Feydhoo; a separate island office was built, and those relocated by the government were given lands in compensation.

Maradhoo-Feydhoo is today a district of the greater Addu City region, the second most populous urban centre in the Maldives.

Geography
The district has a size of 0.103 km2
of this, 0.25 are on the island of Maradhoo with a population of 1100,
0.673 are on the island of Feydhoo (5200),
and 0.13 are on islands between them.

References

External links
 Maradhoo-Feydhoo - Inhabited Island - Seenu Atoll isles.egov.mv

Islands of the Maldives
Addu Atoll